Leyte's 5th congressional district is one of the five congressional districts of the Philippines in the province of Leyte. It has been represented in the House of Representatives of the Philippines since 1931. The district consists of the city of Baybay and adjacent municipalities of Abuyog, Bato, Hilongos, Hindang, Inopacan, Javier, Mahaplag and Matalom. It is currently represented in the 19th Congress by Carl Cari of the PDP-Laban.

Representation history

Election results

2022

2019

2016

2013

2010

See also
Legislative districts of Leyte

References

Congressional districts of the Philippines
Politics of Leyte (province)
1930 establishments in the Philippines
Congressional districts of Eastern Visayas
Constituencies established in 1930